The Fort Payne Depot Museum (formerly the Alabama Great Southern Railroad Passenger Depot) is a historic building in Fort Payne, Alabama.  The depot was built by the Alabama Great Southern Railroad in 1891, at the height of Fort Payne's mining-driven boom.  Passenger service ended in 1970, but the depot continued to service freight until 1983.  It was converted into a museum in 1986, which includes exhibits with 19th century and Native American artifacts, a collection of dioramas of fantasy scenes and historical events, and a former Norfolk Southern caboose.  The depot was designed in Richardsonian Romanesque style by architect Charles C. Taylor.  It is clad in grey sandstone with pink granite trim.  The hipped roof has several gables protruding from it, as well as a circular tower on one corner.  The depot was listed on the National Register of Historic Places in 1971.

References

External links

National Register of Historic Places in DeKalb County, Alabama
Railway stations on the National Register of Historic Places in Alabama
Romanesque Revival architecture in Alabama
Railway stations in the United States opened in 1891
Transportation buildings and structures in DeKalb County, Alabama
Railroad museums in Alabama
Museums in DeKalb County, Alabama
Former railway stations in Alabama